Center City is an unincorporated community in Mills County, located in the U.S. state of Texas. According to the Handbook of Texas, the community had a population of 15 in 2003.

History
The area in what is known as Center City today was first settled around 1870. When Center City was first laid out, a large area was saved for a courthouse to be built on, with several businesses being built around the square. These included saloons, dry goods stores, two blacksmith shops, a general store, and a drugstore. Afterward, Goldthwaite became the county seat. A post office was established in 1874 and remained in operation until 1920 when mail was sent from Goldthwaite. The community also had a gristmill in 1874. A church was established six years later. The population was first recorded as 100 in 1885. Two more churches were built in 1910. There were three stores and 75 residents in Center City in the late 1940s. It dropped to 15 from 1970 to 2003. That year, it had two churches, a combination hardware store/gas station, and a giant live oak tree. This tree was reported to be in the geographical center of Texas and was surveyed in the early 1870s. Thus, its name was changed from Hughes Store to Center City. It is included in Famous Trees of Texas and was said to have held justice court under its branches until a courthouse was built. Church services were also held here.

William Jenkins, David Morris, and their families settled here in 1864. It was originally named Hughes Store when W.C. Hughes and his wife built a store here in the 1870s. There is also a cemetery in the community.

The Geoff Mack song I've Been Everywhere has a Texas version that mentions Center City in its fourth verse.

Geography

Education
Center City had its own school in 1874 with classes also being held under the old oak tree. Today, the community is served by the Star Independent School District.

Notable person
 Harvey Miles, final mayor of Renner, was born in Center City.

References

Unincorporated communities in Mills County, Texas
Unincorporated communities in Texas